Sobasina paradoxa is a jumping spider.

Name
The epitheton paradoxa is based on the unusual body form, compared with other Sobasina species.

Appearance
Sobasina paradoxa looks somewhat like a beetle, unlike other Sobasina species that more resemble ants.

Distribution
Sobasina paradoxa is only known from Viti Levu, Fiji.

References
  (1998): Salticidae of the Pacific Islands. III.  Distribution of Seven Genera, with Description of Nineteen New Species and Two New Genera. Journal of Arachnology  26(2): 149-189. PDF

External links
 Salticidae.org: Diagnostic drawings

Salticidae
Endemic fauna of Fiji
Spiders of Fiji
Spiders described in 1998